Sky is a 2021 Russian aviation action war film written and directed by Igor Kopylov, about the Russian military pilots in Syria, and the 2015 shootdown of an Su-24 over Turkey-Syrian airspace.
The film was shot with the support of the Ministry of Defense of the Russian Federation and is included in the list of films that must be watched in the Armed Forces of the Russian Federation.

The three main characters are: Lieutenant Colonel Oleg Soshnikov (Igor Petrenko), Captain Konstantin Muravyov (Ivan Batarev), and 
Major Vadim Zakharov (Sergey Gubanov). Three different characters, three different fates, which are destined to converge at the Khmeimim Air Base.

Sky was theatrically released in Russia on November 18, 2021 by Central Partnership.

Background 
The film is based on events in the lives of aviators Oleg Peshkov and Konstantin Murakhtin: on November 24, 2015, during a combat flight, their Russian Sukhoi Su-24 fighter jet was shot down by a Turkish fighter in northern Syria. Peshkov and Murakhtin ejected, but Peshkov was still shot by rebels in the air.
 
Konstantin Murakhtin, who survived, was awarded the Order of Courage.

Plot 
The film is about three Russian Officers with different backgrounds, who converge at the Khmeimim military base, involved with the shootdown of a Russian Su-24 by a Turkish F-16 over Turko-Syrian airspace in 2015, and the rescue of the crew shortly after.

Cast 
 Igor Petrenko as Lieutenant Colonel Oleg Soshnikov, the Russian Air Force pilot (based on Oleg Peshkov)
 Ivan Batarev as Captain Konstantin Muravyov, a navigator (based on Konstantin Murakhtin)
 Sergey Gubanov as Major Vadim Zakharov, Special Operations Forces Officer of the Russian Army
 Maria Mironova as Gelena Soshnikova, Oleg Soshnikov's wife
 Glafira Kopylova as Arina Soshnikova, Oleg Soshnikov's daughter
 Marina Mitrofanova as Albina Muravyova, Konstantin Muravyov's wife
  as Bagaev
 Dmitry Vlaskin as Zavyalov
 Sergey Zharkov as Chusov
 Dmitry Blokhin as Oleg Soshnikov's friend
 Igor Botvin as Grishin
 Ilya Shakunov as Kubalsky
 Anatoly Kot as Russian Defense Minister Sergey Shubin (based on Sergey Shoygu)
 Igor Filippov as Aksyonov, commander-in-chief of the Russian Aerospace Forces (based on Viktor Bondarev)
 Andrey Abramov as President of Russia
 Sofya Priss as Vera Lopakhina

Production 
The film was produced by the 3xMedia film company together with the Russian Ministry of Defense.

Filming 
Principal photography began in the Republic of Crimea in October 2020; later they went to Syria, Moscow, Saint Petersburg and Lipetsk, including at the existing facilities of the Ministry of Defense of the Russian Federation.

Release

Marketing 
The first teaser trailer for Mission "Sky" was released on August 23, 2021.

Theatrical 
The pre-premiere screening of the film took place on November 14, 2021 in Saint Petersburg. The first spectators were officers of the 6th Red Banner Leningrad Army of Air and Air Defence Forces, cadets of military educational institutions, servicemen of the military police, filmmakers, heads of veteran organizations and military patriotic clubs.

Mission "Sky" premiered at the Karo 11 October cinema center in Moscow on November 17, 2021. It is scheduled to be theatrically released in the Russian Federation on November 18, 2021 by Central Partnership.

References

External links 
 Official website 
 

2021 films
2020s Russian-language films
2021 action drama films
2021 war drama films
Russian aviation films
Russian action war films
Russian action drama films
Russian war drama films
Films about Russian military operations in Syria
2020s biographical films
Biographical action films
Russian biographical films
Biographical films about military personnel
Films about aviators
Films about shot-down aviators
Films set on aircraft
Films shot in Moscow
Films shot in Saint Petersburg
Films shot in Crimea
Films shot in Russia
Films shot in Syria